Desperation may refer to:

 Despair
 Panic
 Desperation (novel), a 1996 Stephen King novel set in the fictional town of Desperation, Nevada
 Stephen King's Desperation (film), a 2006 TV movie based on King's novel
 Desperation (sculpture), an 1899/1900 work by Auguste Rodin
 Desperation (Desperation Band album), 2003
 Desperation (Hostyle Gospel album), 2013
 Desperation (Oblivians album), by Oblivians, 2013
 Desperation Records, a record label by Barenaked Ladies
 Omorashi, a fetishism sometimes referred to in the Western world as "desperation fetishism"
"Desperation", a song by Steppenwolf from their debut album Steppenwolf, later covered by Humble Pie for their debut album As Safe as Yesterday Is

See also
 Desperate (disambiguation)